Naval Submarine Base Bangor is a former submarine base of the United States Navy that was merged with Naval Station Bremerton into Naval Base Kitsap in 2004.

History
The Naval Support Base Bangor's naval history began in 1942 when it became a site for shipping ammunition to the Pacific Theater of Operations during World War II. For an expansion and to establish a permanent naval base, the U.S. Navy purchased 7,676 acres (3100 hectares) of land on the Hood Canal near the town of Bangor, Washington for approximately $18.7 million.  The U.S. Naval ammunition magazine was established on June 5, 1944, for its construction, and it began operations in January 1945.

Beginning in World War II, and through the Korean War and the Vietnam War, until January 1973, the Bangor Annex continued its service as a U.S. Navy Ammunition Depot responsible for shipping conventional weapons abroad.

In 1973, the Navy announced the selection of the Bangor base as the home port for the first squadron of  Trident Fleet Ballistic Missile submarines. On February 1, 1977, the Trident Submarine Base was officially activated. Naval Base Kitsap includes the Strategic Weapons Facility Pacific (SWFPAC) which provides maintenance, calibration, missile assembly/test, spare parts, and spare nuclear warhead storage for the UGM-133 Trident II submarine-launched ballistic missiles carried by the nuclear submarines.

This Trident submarine base is the sole one for the U.S. Pacific Fleet, with the Trident submarine base at Kings Bay, Georgia, for the U.S. Atlantic Fleet being the only other one.

The Marine Corps Security Forces Battalion Bangor has secured the ballistic missile submarines and associated infrastructure since before it was specifically designated a security unit, at company size, in October 1978.

See also
 Maritime Force Protection Unit
United States Navy submarine bases
World War II United States Merchant Navy

References

Buildings and structures in Kitsap County, Washington
Base Bangor
Naval installations in Washington (state)
Nuclear weapons
1942 establishments in Washington (state)